Jaypee University of Engineering and Technology (JUET), formerly Jaypee Institute of Engineering and Technology, is a private engineering University located at Raghogarh, Guna, Madhya Pradesh, India.

University Status 
Jaypee University of Engineering & Technology, Raghogarh, Guna (M.P.) has been established under Madhya Pradesh Private University (Sthapana Avam Sanchalan) Samsodhan Adhiniyam 2010 vide Act No. 23 of 2010 published in Madhya Pradesh Gazette (Extraordinary) Notification Sr. No. 420 dated 13 August 2010.

The university is approved by UGC under UGC Act, 1956, and is empowered to award degrees as specified under section 22 of UGC Act.
	
 JUET has been accredited with grade "A" by NAAC
 JUET Ranked Amongst India's Top Private Universities : Seasonal Magazine 2015
 AICTE and UGC Approved University
 Approval/Membership - Association of Indian Universities

Establishment of university by Madhya Pradesh Act No. 23 of 2010 - Madhya Pradedh Niji Vishwavidyalaya (Sthapna Avam Sanchalan) Sansodhan Adhiniyam, 2010

Campus
JUET is approved as a remote center of IIT Bombay under NME-ICT program of ministry of HRD.

Departments
The university includes the following departments:
 Department of Computer Science and Engineering
 Department of Electronics and Communication Technology
 Department of Civil Engineering
 Department of Physics
 Department of Mathematics
 Department of Mechanical Engineering
 Department of Chemical Engineering
 Department of Chemistry
 Department of Humanities & Social Sciences
 Cement Research Development Centre
 Wind Engineering Application Centre

Academics

Academic programmes 
Institute offers undergraduate programs leading to a Bachelor of Technology degree,  postgraduate programs leading to a Master of Technology degree and PhD (Doctor of Philosophy) degree. Institute also offers BSc and MSc program.

Programs offered 
Faculty of Engineering
B.Tech.
Chemical Engineering
Civil Engineering
Computer Science & Engineering
Electronics & Communication Engineering
Mechanical Engineering 	 
M.Tech.
Chemical Engineering
Civil Engineering
 Construction Management
 Environmental Engineering
Structural Engineering
Computer Science & Engineering
Electronics & Communication Engineering
Mechanical Engineering
Manufacturing Technology	 
Ph.D.
Chemical Engineering
Civil Engineering
Computer Science & Engineering
Electronics & Communication Engineering
Mechanical Engineering
Chemistry
Humanities & Social Sciences
Mathematics
Physics 	 
Faculty of Mathematical Sciences
B.Sc. Hons. (Mathematics)
M.Sc. (Mathematics)
Ph.D. (Mathematics) 
Faculty of Sciences
B.Sc. (Hons.) in Chemistry
B.Sc. (Hons.) in Physics
M.Sc. (Chemistry)
M.Sc. (Physics)
Ph.D. (Chemistry)
Ph.D. (Physics)

Philosophy of teaching and examination
The philosophy of teaching and examination aim to develop a number of qualities in students such as:

 Sustained Disciplined Work
 Self Learning
 Flexibility in Pace of Learning
 Design Orientation
 Quality Consciousness
 Co-operative working etc.
Accordingly, the course structure of each program have been prepared for credit based semester system. The Courses are designed to provide a strong blend of class room lectures, tutorials, laboratory work, hands-on practice oriented projects, design projects, plant visits and seminars. Provision of electives and flexibility of choosing extra credits give the students an opportunities to develop in areas of their interest.

The concept of transparent continuous evaluation is followed. The students have to appear in T-1, T-2 and T-3 examination in every semester, besides students are required to be regular in attendance. The results are announced within two weeks of examinations. Grade system is followed.

Rankings

Jaypee University of Engineering and Technology was ranked in the 101-150 band among universities in India by the National Institutional Ranking Framework (NIRF) in 2020.

Collaboration and international relations
Jaypee University has international relations with University of Florida

Student life

Hostel
The university has separate hostel facilities for boys and girls. Presently, there are 21 blocks of boy's hostels having the capacity to accommodate 2360 students. The girls hostel is having the capacity to accommodate around 424 inmates.

See also
Jaypee Institute of Information Technology
Jaypee University of Information Technology

References

External links 
 JUET official website

All India Council for Technical Education
Information technology institutes
Private universities in India
Engineering colleges in Madhya Pradesh
Guna district
Jaypee Group
Educational institutions established in 2003
2003 establishments in Madhya Pradesh